Tien Hung-mao (born 7 November 1938) is a Taiwanese politician. He was the Minister of Foreign Affairs from 20 May 2000 until 1 February 2002.

Career
Tien received a Ph.D. from the University of Wisconsin–Madison in 1969, where he wrote his dissertation on political development in China from 1927 to 1937. Thereafter he was a university professor for more than twenty years, and naturalised as a U.S. citizen. After he moved back to Taiwan, Lee Teng-hui had asked him twice in the 1990s to serve in the Executive Yuan Council, but each time he refused; reportedly, the requirement that he renounce U.S. citizenship was a major barrier. He eventually accepted Chen Shui-bian's offer to become Minister of Foreign Affairs, and renounced his U.S. citizenship on 11 May, eight days before taking office. He later stated in an interview that he did not regret this step at all, because he "loved Taiwan". After his term ended, he took up a new post as the head of Taipei Representative Office in the U.K. He resigned the position in 2004, and later led the Institute of National Policy Research. In 2016, Tsai Ing-wen named Tien the chair of the Straits Exchange Foundation. He left the position in March 2018.

Selected works

References

1938 births
Living people
Taiwanese Ministers of Foreign Affairs
Tunghai University alumni
University of Wisconsin–Madison alumni
Former United States citizens
Taiwanese emigrants to the United States
Representatives of Taiwan to the United Kingdom